Jūlija Vansoviča (born 24 August 1975) is a Latvian fencer. She competed in the women's individual épée event at the 2000 Summer Olympics.

References

External links
 

1975 births
Living people
Latvian female épée fencers
Olympic fencers of Latvia
Fencers at the 2000 Summer Olympics
Sportspeople from Riga